A is a vowel of Indic abugidas. In modern Indic scripts, A is derived from the early "Ashoka" Brahmi letter  after having gone through the Gupta letter . Bare consonants without a modifying vowel sign have the "A" vowel inherently, and thus there is no modifier sign for "A" in Indic scripts.

Āryabhaṭa numeration

Aryabhata used Devanagari letters for numbers, very similar to the Greek numerals, even after the invention of Indian numerals. The letter अ was not used in the Aryabhata number system, and consonants with the inherent "a" vowel retained their base value.

Historic A
There are three different general early historic scripts - Brahmi and its variants, Kharoṣṭhī, and Tocharian, the so-called slanting Brahmi. A as found in standard Brahmi,  was a simple geometric shape, with variations toward more flowing forms by the Gupta . Like all Brahmic scripts, the Tocharian A  is the inherent vowel for all consonant characters, apart from the alternate Fremdzeichen forms, which have the inherent vowel "Ä". In Kharoṣṭhī, the only independent vowel letter is for the inherent A, with all other independent vowels built from vowel marks added to A.

Brahmi A
The Brahmi letter , A, is probably derived from the  Aramaic Alef , and is thus related to the modern Latin A and Greek Alpha. Several identifiable styles of writing the Brahmi A can be found, most associated with a specific set of inscriptions from an artifact or diverse records from an historic period. As the earliest and most geometric style of Brahmi, the letters found on the Edicts of Ashoka and other records from around that time are normally the reference form for Brahmi letters, with vowel marks not attested until later forms of Brahmi back-formed to match the geometric writing style.

Tocharian A
The Tocharian letter  is derived from the Brahmi .

Kharoṣṭhī A
The Kharoṣṭhī letter A is the only independent vowel in Kharosthi. It is derived from the  Aramaic Alef , and is thus related to A and Alpha, as well as the Brahmi A.

Devanagari A

A (अ) is a vowel of the Devanagari abugida. It ultimately arose from the Brahmi letter , after having gone through the Gupta letter . Letters that derive from it are the Gujarati letter અ, and the Modi letter 𑘀.

Devanagari Using Languages
The Devanagari script is used to write the Hindi language, Sanskrit and the majority of  Indo-Aryan languages. Like all Indic scripts, Devanagari vowels come in two forms: an independent vowel form for syllables that begin with a vowel sound. However, since /ə/ is the inherent vowel of all consonants, there is no need for an A vowel sign.

Bengali A

A (অ) is a vowel of the Bengali abugida. It is derived from the Siddhaṃ letter , and is marked by a similar horizontal head line, but less geometric shape, than its Devanagari counterpart, अ.

Bengali Script Using Languages
The Bengali script is used to write several languages of eastern India, notably the Bengali language and Assamese. Like all Indic scripts, Bengali vowels come in two forms: an independent vowel form for syllables that begin with a vowel sound. However, Bengali A represents the /ɔ/ vowel inherent in all consonants, and is thus indicated by the lack of any modifying vowel sign.

Gujarati A

A (અ) is a vowel of the Gujarati abugida. It is derived from the Devanagari A , and ultimately the Brahmi letter .

Gujarati-using Languages
The Gujarati script is used to write the Gujarati and Kutchi languages. Like all Indic scripts, Gujarati vowels come in two forms: an independent vowel form for syllables that begin with a vowel sound. However, since A is the inherent vowel in unmarked consonants, there is no A vowel sign in Gujarati.

Javanese A

Telugu A

A (అ) is a vowel of the Telugu abugida. It ultimately arose from the Brahmi letter . It is closely related to the Kannada letter ಅ. Like in other Indic scripts, "A" in Telugu is inherent in all consonants, and there is no vowel sign for the "A" vowel.

Malayalam A

A (അ) is a vowel of the Malayalam abugida. It ultimately arose from the Brahmi letter , via the Grantha letter  a. Like in other Indic scripts, "A" is the inherent vowel of Malayalam consonants, so there is no modifying vowel sign for A. As in most Indic scripts, independent Malayalam vowels do not decompose into A with a vowel sign attached, but rather are unique characters themselves. Independent vowel letters in Malayalam are used when a word begins with a vowel, rather than a consonant sound.

Odia A

A (ଅ) is a vowel of the Odia abugida. It ultimately arose from the Brahmi letter , via the Siddhaṃ letter  a. Like in other Indic scripts, Odia consonants inherently contain the "a" vowel, so there is no modifying sign for indicating that vowel.

Thai script 
O ang (อ) and Ho nokhuk (ฮ) are the forty-third and forty-fourth letters of the Thai script. Unlike many Indic scripts, Thai consonants do not form conjunct ligatures, and use the pinthu—an explicit virama with a dot shape—to indicate bare consonants.

O ang 
In IPA, O ang is pronounced as [ʔ] at the beginning of a syllable and not be used to close a syllable. It falls under the middle class of Thai consonants. In the acrophony of the Thai script, ang (อ่าง) means 'basin'. O ang corresponds to the Sanskrit character 'अ'.

Ho nokhuk 
In IPA, Ho nokhuk is pronounced as [h] at the beginning of a syllable and not be used to close a syllable. It falls under the low class of Thai consonants. In the acrophony of the Thai script, nokhuk (นกฮูก) means 'owl'.

Comparison of A
The various Indic scripts are generally related to each other through adaptation and borrowing, and as such the glyphs for cognate letters, including A, are related as well.

Character encodings of A
Most Indic scripts are encoded in the Unicode Standard, and as such the letter A in those scripts can be represented in plain text with unique codepoint. A from several modern-use scripts can also be found in legacy encodings, such as ISCII.

References

Indic letters